Sherwood Press Taylor (born January 13, 1988) is an American football coach who is the offensive coordinator for the Jacksonville Jaguars of the National Football League (NFL). He previously served an assistant coach for the Indianapolis Colts and Philadelphia Eagles.

College career
Taylor won back-to-back NJCAA national championships at Butler Community College as the starting quarterback. As a sophomore at Butler, Taylor threw for over 2,300 yards, ran for 300 yards, and accounted for 27 touchdowns while completing 61% of his passes.

Taylor was rated by Rivals.com as the #2 pro-style quarterback in the 2009 junior college rankings and chose Marshall in the December signing period over interest from Louisville and Colorado State. Taylor lettered in his 2 seasons at Marshall University. However, he was only a backup for the Thundering Herd, throwing three passes in two seasons. He knew for years his true passion was with coaching football, and he began his coaching career after his eligibility expired.

Coaching career

Early career
Taylor joined the University of Tulsa coaching staff under Head Coach Bill Blankenship in 2011 as the Offensive Graduate Assistant/Quarterbacks Coach (Tulsa did not have a full-time QB coach, allowing Taylor to handle those duties). During his 2 seasons at Tulsa, the Golden Hurricane compiled a 19–8 record and won the 2012 Conference USA Championship as well as the 2012 AutoZone Liberty Bowl defeating Iowa State. In 2011, under Taylor's direction, senior quarterback G. J. Kinne was named 2nd Team All-C-USA and threw for over 3,000 yards.

Philadelphia Eagles
In 2013, Taylor was hired by the Philadelphia Eagles as an offensive quality control coach under head coach Chip Kelly. With the hiring of new head coach Doug Pederson in 2016, Taylor was retained and promoted to offensive quality control and assistant quarterbacks coach under new offensive coordinator Frank Reich. He was part of the coaching staff that won Super Bowl LII and is credited with the 
"Philly Special" play which gave the Eagles a touchdown in the closing seconds of the first half. After the 2017 season, Taylor was again promoted, this time to quarterbacks coach to replace John DeFilippo who left at the end of the season to become offensive coordinator for the Minnesota Vikings. Taylor added the title of passing game coordinator on February 5, 2020, reporting directly to Pederson. He missed the team's week 11 game in 2020 against the Cleveland Browns due to COVID-19 pandemic protocols. The Eagles fired Pederson after a 4-11-1 season, and the passing staff was not retained.

Indianapolis Colts
For the 2021 season, Taylor served as a senior offensive assistant to Indianapolis Colts head coach Frank Reich. They organized a trade to obtain Eagles quarterback Carson Wentz, reuniting three key offensive strategists from the Eagles' Super Bowl winning season.

Jacksonville Jaguars
On February 17, 2022, Taylor was hired by the Jacksonville Jaguars as their offensive coordinator under head coach Doug Pederson.

Personal life
Taylor is married to Brooklyn Scheer, whom he met at Tulsa. The couple have three kids together. Taylor is the younger brother of Cincinnati Bengals head coach Zac Taylor. Taylor's father, Sherwood, was a defensive back and captain for Oklahoma and head coach Barry Switzer from 1976 to 1979.

Taylor's father was a fan of Pete Maravich and named him after his father Press Maravich.

References

External links
 Jacksonville Jaguars profile

1988 births
Living people
American football quarterbacks
Butler Grizzlies football players
Indianapolis Colts coaches
Jacksonville Jaguars coaches
Marshall University alumni
Marshall Thundering Herd football players
 National Football League offensive coordinators
Philadelphia Eagles coaches
Sportspeople from Norman, Oklahoma